Romanov Palace also known as Likani Palace, is a palace located in Likani, Georgia. The palace was designed by Leon Benois for Grand Duke Nicholas Mikhailovich of Russia.

The total area of Likani Palace is 690 square meters. The first hydroelectric power plant in the Russian Empire was built in 1898 in Likani to illuminate the palace. Next to Grand Duke Nicholas Mikhailovich of Russia lived the Grand Duke Georgy Nikolayevich, who suffered from tuberculosis. In the era of the Romanovs, images of a private house were preserved in photographs by Sergei Prokudin-Gorsky. Part of the furniture of the private house is exhibited in the Georgian Museum of Simon Janashia.

During the USSR, the private house became the property of the state. The leaders of the Communist Party, including Joseph Stalin, rested here. Currently, the private house is the summer residence of the President of Georgia. A museum was opened here in 2016.

External links
 ABOUT SIGHTS – ROMANOV PALACE IN LIKANI

Palaces in Georgia (country)
Buildings and structures in Samtskhe–Javakheti